The Force India VJM06 is a Formula One racing car designed and built by the Force India team for use in the 2013 season where it was driven by Paul di Resta and Adrian Sutil, who returned to the team after spending the 2012 season out of the sport. The car was launched on 1 February 2013 at the team's base near the Silverstone Circuit, and is complete redesign of the previous year's car.

It was the last British-based F1 foreign car to utilize ExxonMobil fuels and lubricants before its use for Red Bull RB13 in 2017.

Complete Formula One results
(key) (results in bold indicate pole position; results in italics indicate fastest lap)

 Driver failed to finish the race, but was classified as they had completed greater than 90% of the race distance.

References

External links

 Official website of the Force India F1 Team

Force India VJM06